Toast is an album by Canadian-American singer-songwriter Neil Young and Crazy Horse. One of Young's several "lost" albums, it was recorded in 2000-2001 but shelved in favor of Are You Passionate?, and was finally released on July 8, 2022. It is Volume 09 of Neil Young Archives' Special Release Series.

Background
The album was recorded in late 2000 and early 2001 at Toast Recording Studios in San Francisco. At that time, Young was going through a difficult period in his marriage to then wife Pegi, which largely influenced the somber mood of the new material. According to guitarist Frank "Poncho" Sampedro, "it felt like there was something wrong" and Young had trouble writing songs. In the middle of the sessions, Neil Young and Crazy Horse took a break from recording to play shows in Brazil and Argentina for the first time; Sampedro claimed that when they came back to the studio, reinvigorated, everything they played "had a Latin feel". However, Young wasn't satisfied with the results and ultimately decided to abandon the sessions: "The songs of Toast were so sad at the time that I couldn't put it out. I just skipped it and went on to do another album in its place".

He instead made Are You Passionate? with Sampedro and Booker T. & the M.G.'s, re-recording "Quit", "How Ya Doin'?" (as "Mr. Disappointment") and "Boom Boom Boom" (as "She's a Healer") from scratch; "Goin' Home" was the only Crazy Horse recording from the Toast sessions to be included in its original form. The title "Gateway of Love" also appeared on Are You Passionate?''' sleeve, but the song itself wasn't included.

Over the next years, Young reappraised the album. In April 2008, Toast was announced for an imminent release as the first installment of the new Special Release Series of Neil Young Archives, with Young comparing it to "a down-played Tonight's The Night" with the "ambient atmosphere, foggy, blue and desolate" pervading the songs. The release failed to materialise, but in the following years Young would periodically talk about Toast in interviews and articles on his website, as well as his memoir Special Deluxe''. It was finally released on July 8, 2022 via Reprise Records on vinyl, CD and digitally.

Track listing

Personnel
Neil Young– vocals, guitar, piano, squeezebox, vibes
Ralph Molina– drums, percussion, vocals
Frank Sampedro– guitar, vocals
Billy Talbot– bass guitar, vocals
Pegi Young– vocals
Astrid Young– vocals
Tom Bray– trumpet
Engineering and production
Neil Young– production, art direction
John Hanlon– production, engineering
Niko Bolas– editing
Aaron Prellwitz, Alex Osborne, John Hausmann– assistant engineers
Chris Bellman– mastering
Hannah Johnson, Ebet Roberts– photography
Gary Burden, Janice Heo– art direction & design

Charts

References

2022 albums
Neil Young albums
Crazy Horse (band) albums
Reprise Records albums